Kallirhynchia is an extinct genus of brachiopods found in Jurassic strata in Europe, North Africa, the Middle East, India and Uzbekistan. It was a stationary epifaunal suspension feeder.

Species previously assigned to Kallirhynchia 

 K. sharpi = Sharpirhynchia sharpi

References 

Rhynchonellida
Prehistoric brachiopod genera
Jurassic brachiopods
Jurassic animals of Europe